Government Junta of Chile (August 10, 1811), also known as the Executive Junta or the Second Government Junta, was the organ established to rule Chile following the convocatory of a National Congress.

Background 
After the convocatory of a National Congress on July 4, 1811, the president of the First Junta resigned all the executive powers on the Congress and proceeded to dissolve the Junta. So, from that date until August 10 the sum of all political powers was concentrated in that body.

Members

History 
The Junta assumed the executive powers by dictate of the National Congress, but soon thereafter Juan Martínez de Rozas decided to challenge its powers and resume his leadership of the revolutionary movement. The Junta lasted only just a little over 3 weeks. On September 4, 1811, in a bloodless coup, the Junta was forced to resign and be replaced by the Superior Junta.

See also 
 Chilean Independence
 History of Chile
 List of Government Juntas of Chile
 List of Heads of State

External links 
 La Aurora de Chile, First Chilean Newspaper (1812) online. 
 Monograph 

Government of Chile